Beauchêne is a former commune in the Orne department in the Normandy region in northwestern France. On 1 January 2015, Beauchêne and six other communes merged becoming one commune called Tinchebray-Bocage.

Population

See also
Communes of the Orne department

References

External links

Official site

Former communes of Orne